Tubby is a nickname and surname and may refer to:

People

Nickname
 Tubby Clayton (1885–1972), Anglican clergyman, founder of the Christian movement Toc H
 Michael Lindsay Coulton Crawford (1917–2017), Second World War Royal Navy officer and submariner
 A. A. Englander (1915–2004), British television cinematographer
 D. V. Graves (1886–1960), American college head coach in baseball, football and basketball
 Tubby Hall (1895–1945), American jazz drummer
 Tubby Hayes (1935–1973), English jazz musician
 Tubby Howard (1894–1969), American National Football League player
 Frank W. Lockwood (1890–1954), American college football player
 Tubby Meyers (1887–1940), American college football player and coach
Tubby Raskin (1902–1981), American basketball player and coach
 Tubby Raymond (born 1926),  American college football and baseball player and College Football Hall of Fame coach
 George Scales (1900–1976), American Negro league baseball player and manager
 Tubby Schmalz (1916–1981), Canadian ice hockey administrator
 Tubby Spencer (1884–1945), American Major League Baseball catcher
 Tubby Smith (born 1951), American college basketball coach
 Mark Taylor (cricketer) (born 1965), Australian batsman and captain

Surname
 Fred Tubby (born 1947), Australian politician
 Reg Tubby (1924–2015), Australian politician
 Roger Tubby (1910–1991), American government official, reporter and editor, White House Press Secretary from 1952 to 1953
 William Tubby (1858–1944), American architect

Other
 King Tubby, Jamaican electronics and sound engineer Osbourne Ruddock (1941–1989)

Fictional characters
 Tubby, a dog in the Pup Parade comic strip
 Thomas "Tubby" Tompkins, a boy in the Little Lulu comic strip who had a series of his own from 1952 to 1961
 the title character of:
 "Tubby the Tuba" (song) (1945)
 Tubby the Tuba (1947 film), a movie short based on the song
 Tubby the Tuba (1975 film), an animated movie based on the song

Animals
 Tubby, a dog, the only fatality of the Tacoma Narrows Bridge disaster

See also
 Tubby protein, implicated in obesity
 Teletubbies, a children's television program

Lists of people by nickname